Gordon Barracks is a military installation situated in Bridge of Don, Aberdeen.

History
The barrack buildings, which were built by J and W Wittet between 1933 and 1935, are located around the barrack square. 

Constructed of dressed granite blocks, the two-storey central block, once used as the Junior Ranks Club, is typical of the style with three bays and being rectangular in shape. The roof is crowstepped and slated. It has very grand Royal coated arms tripartite above with pediment detail. Other listed buildings include: the Medical Reception Centre, three barracks blocks, the Guard Room, Gate Piers and Gates, Married Quarters, the Officers Mess and the Gymnasium. The barracks became the depot of the Gordon Highlanders, who had relocated from Castlehill Barracks, as soon as they opened in 1935.

The barracks became the regional centre for infantry training as the Highland Brigade Depot in 1960. In 1970, following the formation of the Scottish Division, adult Highland Brigade recruits removed to The Scottish Division Depot at Glencorse Barracks, Penicuik. Junior soldiers from the Lowland Brigade moved from Glencorse to Gordon Barracks on the same day. The barracks closed to Junior Soldier training in 1986.

Gordon Barracks are now used by a variety of organisations, including Territorial Army (TA) signals and medical units.

Based units 
The following units are based at Gordon Barracks.

British Army
 Detachment, A Company, 51st Highland, 7th Battalion, Royal Regiment of Scotland 
 851 Troop, 2 Signal Squadron, 32 Signal Regiment 
 A Detachment, 205 (Scottish) Field Hospital, Royal Army Medical Corps
Aberdeen University Officers' Training Corps

Her Majesty's Naval Service
 Aberdeen Detachment, Royal Marines Reserve Scotland

References

Barracks in Scotland
Buildings and structures in Aberdeen
History of Aberdeen
Installations of the British Army